USCGC Cape Darby was a  type "C"  constructed at the Coast Guard Yard at Curtis Bay, Maryland in 1958 for use as a law enforcement and search and rescue patrol boat.

Design
The Cape-class cutter was designed originally for use as a shallow-draft anti-submarine warfare (ASW) craft and was needed because of the increased tension brought about by the Cold War. Cape Darby was a type "C" Cape-class cutter and was never fitted with ASW gear because the Coast Guard's mission emphasis had shifted away from ASW to search and rescue by the time she was built. The hull was constructed of steel and the superstructure was aluminum. She was powered by four Cummins VT-600 diesel engines.

History
The Cape class was originally developed as an ASW boat and as a replacement for the aging, World War II vintage, wooden  patrol boats that were used mostly for search and rescue duties. With the outbreak of the Korean War and the requirement tasked to the Coast Guard to secure and patrol port facilities in the United States under the Magnuson Act of 1950, the complete replacement of the 83-foot boat was deferred and the 95-foot boat was used for harbor patrols. The first 95-foot hulls were laid down at the Coast Guard Yard in 1952 and were officially described as "seagoing patrol cutters". The class was named for North American geographic capes.

The Cape class was replaced by the   beginning in the late 1980s and many of the decommissioned cutters were transferred to nations of the Caribbean and South America by the Coast Guard.

Cape Darby was initially assigned a homeport at Provincetown, Massachusetts where she was used for law enforcement and search and rescue (SAR) missions. In 1964 her homeport was shifted to Key West, Florida where she continued to be used for law enforcement and SAR duties. In mid-September she towed and took aboard 50 Cuban refugees from two boats and took them to Dry Tortugas, Florida. On 27 January 1966, she escorted a boat carrying four Cuban refugees to Key West. On 5 January 1967 Cape Darby towed a disabled small craft carrying four Cubans to Key West. On 13 August she escorted the motor vessel Gran Lempira which had rescued 29 Cuban refugees to Key West. On 23 October she took aboard four Cuban refugees from the fishing vessel Stella Mystery.

Cape Darby and her crew earned the Navy Expeditionary Medal for operations relating to the Cuban refugee exodus from 3 January 1961 until 23 October 1962.

Disposition
Cape Darby was decommissioned on 24 March 1969 and transferred to South Korea as PB 11. PB 11 was decommissioned by South Korea in 1984.

Notes
Citations

References used

 
 
 
 
 

1958 ships
Darby
Ships built by the United States Coast Guard Yard